British-born Australian singer Ruel has released one studio album, three extended plays and 26 singles (including four as a featured artist).

Albums

Extended plays

Singles

As lead artist

As featured artist

Other charted songs

Other appearances

Music videos

Notes

References

Discographies of Australian artists
Pop music discographies
Rhythm and blues discographies